The 2018–19 season was the 139th season of competitive football by Rangers. It is their third consecutive season back in the top tier of Scottish football, having been promoted from the Scottish Championship at the end of the 2015–16 season. Rangers also competed in the Europa League, progressing through four qualifying rounds before being eliminated at the group stage. They were knocked out of both domestic cups (League Cup and Scottish Cup) by Aberdeen.

Results and fixtures

Pre-season and friendlies

Scottish Premiership

League Cup

Scottish Cup

Europa League

Qualification stage

Group stage

Squad statistics
The table below includes all players registered with the SPFL as part of the Rangers squad for 2018–19 season. They may not have made an appearance.

Appearances, goals and discipline
{| class="wikitable sortable" style="text-align:center"
|-
!rowspan="2" style="background:#00f; color:white;" |No.
!rowspan="2" style="background:#00f; color:white;" |Pos.
!rowspan="2" style="background:#00f; color:white;" |Nat.
!rowspan="2" style="background:#00f; color:white;" |Name
!colspan="2" style="background:#00f; color:white;" |Totals
!colspan="2" style="background:#00f; color:white;" |Scottish Premiership
!colspan="2" style="background:#00f; color:white;" |Scottish Cup
!colspan="2" style="background:#00f; color:white;" |League Cup
!colspan="2" style="background:#00f; color:white;" |Europa League
!colspan="2" style="background:#00f; color:white;" |Discipline
|-
!Apps
!Goals
!Apps
!Goals
!Apps
!Goals
!Apps
!Goals
!Apps
!Goals
!
!
|-
! colspan=16 style=background:#dcdcdc; text-align:center| Goalkeepers
|-
||4||1
||0||0
||0||0
|-
! colspan=16 style=background:#dcdcdc; text-align:center| Defenders
|-
||1||0
||2||0
||0||0
||10||0
||9||1
||1||0
||0||0
||0||0
||4||0
||1||0
|-
! colspan=16 style=background:#dcdcdc; text-align:center| Midfielders
|-
||0||0
||6||0
||1||0
||2||0
||6||1
||2||1
||0||0
||10||2
||1||0
||0||0
||2||0
||9||1
||0||0
||1||0
|-
! colspan=16 style=background:#dcdcdc; text-align:center| Forwards
|-
||1||0
||2||0
||4||0
||19||5
||0||0
|-
! colspan=16 style=background:#dcdcdc; text-align:center|  Players transferred or loaned out during the season
||1||0
||3||0
||2||0
||1||0
||0||0
||0||0
||0||0
||0||0
||0||0
||0||0
||0||0
||0||0
||0||0
||0||0
||0||0
||0||0
||0||0
||0||0
||0||0

Appearances (starts and substitute appearances) and goals include those in Scottish Premiership, League Cup, Scottish Cup, and the UEFA Europa League

Club

First Team Staff
As of 19 July 2018

Club Staff
As of 19 July 2018

Board of Directors – Rangers International Football Club Plc
As of 21 August 2018

Board of Directors – The Rangers Football Club Ltd
As of 19 July 2018

Club statistics

Competition Overview

League table

Management statistics
Last updated 19 May 2019

Transfers

Players in

Players out

Loans in

Loans out

See also
List of Rangers F.C. seasons

Notes

References 

Rangers F.C. seasons
Rangers
Rangers